Andaleeb is a 1969 Pakistani Urdu colour film starring Waheed Murad, Shabnam, Aliya, and Mustafa Qureshi, and Talish. It was a golden jubilee hit directed by Farid Ahmed, produced by Rashid Mukhtar, and music composed by Nisar Bazmi. Andaleeb received 4 Nigar Awards in different categories.

Plot
This film is a musical love story based on Salma Kanwal's novel by the same title, "Andaleeb".

Cast 
 Shabnam
 Waheed Murad
 Aliya Begum
 Mustafa Qureshi
 Talish
 Salma Mumtaz
 Lehri
 Ibrahim Nafees
 Rajni
 Baby Durdana
 Atia Ashraf
 Talat Siddiqi
 Meena Chaudhry
 Pandit Shahed
 Sultana Iqbal
 Niggo
 Meena Chaudhary

Music
The music of the film was composed by well-known musician Nisar Bazmi. The song Kuch log rooth kar be lagte hain kitne pyare written by Masroor Anwar was one of his big super-hit songs for 1969. 

Songs of the film are:
 by Runa Laila
 by Ahmad Rushdi
 by Ahmad Rushdi
 by Ahmad Rushdi and Noor Jehan
 by Runa Laila
 by Noor Jehan
 by Noor Jehan, film song written by Kaleem Usmani
 by Runa Laila and Dina Laila

Box office
The film was a golden jubilee hit, completing 56 weeks in theaters.

Awards
Andaleeb won four Nigar Awards in the following categories:

Trivia
Initially, the actress Shabnam was not able to speak Urdu fluently, so for Andaleeb, her dialogues were by a lady Kaukab Afzal.

References

External links 
 

1969 films
Pakistani romantic drama films
Urdu-language Pakistani films
1960s Urdu-language films
Nigar Award winners
Films based on Pakistani novels